The Last Ride to Santa Cruz is a 1964 West German-Austrian Western film directed by Rolf Olsen and starring Edmund Purdom, Mario Adorf, and Marianne Koch. The film was shot at the Spandau Studios, and on location in the Canary Islands. The sets were designed by the art directors Hertha Hareiter, Leo Metzenbauer and Otto Pischinger

Cast
 Edmund Purdom as Rex Kelly
 Mario Adorf as Pedro Ortiz
 Marianne Koch as Elizabeth Kelly
 Klaus Kinski as José
 Marisa Mell as Juanita
 Walter Giller as Woody Johnson
 Thomas Fritsch as Carlos
 Sieghardt Rupp as Fernando
 Florian Kuehne as Steve Kelly
 Kurt Nachmann
 Peter Martin Urtel (as Martin Urtel)
 Rainer Brandt as Voice of Pedro Ortiz (voice) (uncredited)
 Edmund Hashim (uncredited)
 Rolf Olsen as John (bank employee) (uncredited)

References

Bibliography

External links

1964 films
1964 Western (genre) films
1960s German-language films
German Western (genre) films
Austrian Western (genre) films
West German films
Films directed by Rolf Olsen
Films shot in the Canary Islands
Constantin Film films
Films shot at Spandau Studios
1960s German films